Liu Fangren (born January 1936) was a Chinese politician. He was born in Wugong County, Shaanxi. He was Chinese Communist Party Committee Secretary (1993–2001) and People's Congress Chairman (1998–2002) of Guizhou. He was CPPCC Committee Chairman of Jiangxi (1993–1994). He was a delegate to the 8th National People's Congress and 9th National People's Congress. He was expelled from the party for corruption and sentenced to life in prison.

References

1936 births
People's Republic of China politicians from Shaanxi
Chinese Communist Party politicians from Shaanxi
Delegates to the 8th National People's Congress
Delegates to the 9th National People's Congress
CPPCC Committee Chairmen of Jiangxi
Deputy Communist Party secretaries of Jiangxi
Expelled members of the Chinese Communist Party
People from Wugong County
Living people
Chinese politicians convicted of corruption